Starzel may refer to:

Starzel (Neckar), a river of Baden-Württemberg, Germany, tributary of the Neckar
Starzel (Prim), a river of Baden-Württemberg, Germany, tributary of the Prim